Nicholas Raymond Leige Price (born 28 January 1957) is a Zimbabwean retired professional golfer who has won three major championships in his career: the PGA Championship twice (in 1992 and 1994) and The Open Championship in 1994. In the mid-1990s, Price reached number one in the Official World Golf Ranking. He was inducted into the World Golf Hall of Fame in 2003.

Background
Price was born in Durban, South Africa. His parents were originally British. His father was English and his mother Welsh. His early life was spent in Rhodesia (present-day Zimbabwe). He attended Prince Edward School in Salisbury (now Harare), where he captained the golf team. After his schooling he served in the Rhodesian Air Force during that country's Bush War. He is at present a dual citizen of the United Kingdom and Zimbabwe. He began his professional golf career in 1977 on the South African Tour, before moving to the European Tour and finally the PGA Tour in 1983. In 1984, Price renounced his Zimbabwean citizenship and thereafter played under his British passport. It was not until 1996 that Price regained his dual citizenship. Price is married to Sue and has three children. They live in Hobe Sound, Florida. Price's nephew Ray Price is a former national cricketer for the Zimbabwe national cricket team.

Early professional years
Price won his first tournament outside of South Africa at the 1980 Swiss Open. He was still relatively unknown when he finished tied for second with Peter Oosterhuis one shot behind Tom Watson at the 1982 Open Championship after having a three-shot lead with six holes to go. Price earned PGA Tour membership after finishing 3rd place at 1982 PGA Tour Qualifying School. In 1983, Price won his first PGA Tour event with a wire to wire four-shot triumph over Jack Nicklaus at the World Series of Golf.

After that win, it would be almost another eight years before Price won again on the PGA Tour. In the interim, Price shot an Augusta National Golf Club course record 63 at the 1986 Masters Tournament and finished second at the 1988 Open Championship to Seve Ballesteros.

Career peak

By the mid-1990s, Price was regarded as the best player in the world, and in 1994 he won two majors back-to-back, The Open and the PGA Championship, adding to his first major, the 1992 PGA Championship. He topped the PGA Tour money list in 1993 and 1994, setting a new earnings record each time, and spent 43 weeks at number one in the Official World Golf Rankings.

Price won the Sunshine Tour Order of Merit for the 1982/83 season and would have won again in 1996/97 if he had met the minimum number of tournaments. In 1993 and 1997, Price was awarded the Vardon Trophy; which is given annually by the PGA of America to the player with the lowest adjusted scoring average with a minimum of 60 rounds.

In 2003, Price was inducted into the World Golf Hall of Fame. In 2005, he was voted the Bob Jones Award, the highest honour given by the USGA in recognition of distinguished sportsmanship in golf. Price received the 2011 Old Tom Morris Award, the highest honour given by the GCSAA to an individual who "through a continuing lifetime commitment to the game of golf has helped to mold the welfare of the game in a manner and style exemplified by Old Tom Morris."

Playing style
During his early career and peak, Price was one of the best ball strikers in the game along with his good friend and contemporary Greg Norman (who in 1996 tied Price's Augusta National course record of 63).

Like fellow African Gary Player, Price has expressed his distaste for the Ryder Cup, saying of the event, "If you like root canals and hemorrhoids, you'd love it there.", but he has played five times as a member of the Presidents Cup.

Although Price continues to play professionally, he has expanded into golf design with his own company operating out of Florida, and he has his own line of signature golf apparel. He is widely regarded by fans, media and his fellow players as one of the most personable golfers on the PGA Tour. He won his first Champions Tour event at the 2009 Outback Steakhouse Pro-Am where he had three double bogeys in his final round, but he hung on to win by two strokes over Larry Nelson.

Professional wins (48)

PGA Tour wins (18)

PGA Tour playoff record (3–3)

European Tour wins (7)

1Co-sanctioned by the Sunshine Tour

European Tour playoff record (2–0)

Japan Golf Tour wins (1)

Sunshine Tour wins (12)

1Co-sanctioned by the European Tour

Sunshine Tour playoff record (1–0)

PGA Tour of Australasia wins (2)

PGA Tour of Australasia playoff record (1–0)

Other European wins (1)
1981 San Remo Masters (Italy)

Other wins (8)

Other playoff record (4–0)

Champions Tour wins (4)

Champions Tour playoff record (1–1)

Playoff record
Asian Tour playoff record (0–1)

Challenge Tour playoff record (0–1)

Major championships

Wins (3)

Results timeline

CUT = missed the halfway cut
"T" indicates a tie for a place.

Summary

Most consecutive cuts made – 10 (1989 PGA – 1992 PGA)
Longest streak of top-10s – 2 (five times)

The Players Championship

Wins (1)

Results timeline

CUT = missed the halfway cut
DQ = disqualified
"T" indicates a tie for a place.

Results in World Golf Championships

1Cancelled due to 9/11

QF, R16, R32, R64 = Round in which player lost in match play
"T" = Tied
NT = No tournament

Team appearances
Amateur
Eisenhower Trophy (representing Rhodesia): 1976

Professional
World Cup: 1978 (representing South Africa), 1993 (representing Zimbabwe)
Alfred Dunhill Cup (representing Zimbabwe): 1993, 1994, 1995, 1996, 1997, 1998, 1999, 2000
Presidents Cup (International Team): 1994, 1996, 1998 (winners), 2000, 2003 (tie), 2013 (non-playing captain), 2015 (non-playing captain), 2017 (non-playing captain)
Alfred Dunhill Challenge (representing Southern Africa): 1995 (winners)
Wendy's 3-Tour Challenge (representing Champions Tour): 2007, 2008 (winners), 2009, 2010

See also
1982 PGA Tour Qualifying School graduates
List of golfers with most PGA Tour wins
List of men's major championships winning golfers

References

External links

Zimbabwean male golfers
Sunshine Tour golfers
European Tour golfers
PGA Tour golfers
PGA Tour Champions golfers
Winners of men's major golf championships
World Golf Hall of Fame inductees
Rhodesian Air Force personnel
Rhodesian military personnel of the Bush War
Alumni of Prince Edward School
White Zimbabwean sportspeople
White South African people
South African emigrants to Rhodesia
Zimbabwean expatriates in the United States
Zimbabwean people of English descent
Zimbabwean people of Welsh descent
Sportspeople from Durban
People from Jupiter Island, Florida
People from Hobe Sound, Florida
1957 births
Living people